Hong Kong Resurgence Order is a localist political organisation in Hong Kong. It was founded by Chin Wan, the "mentor" of localism in Hong Kong and the founder of the city-state theory, in 2014 with a manifesto aiming to "restore the ancient Chinese civilisation".

The group previously announced a plan to contest in the 2016 Legislative Council election with Wong Yuk-man's Proletariat Political Institute and Wong Yeung-tat's Civic Passion.

See also
 Hong Kong Autonomy Movement
 Civic Passion
 Proletariat Political Institute

References

2014 establishments in Hong Kong
Localist parties in Hong Kong
Political organisations based in Hong Kong